Radoslav Ciprys (born 24 June 1987) is a Slovak football midfielder who plays for the TJ Baník Brodské.

Career
He came to Spartak Trnava in January 2011 and made his debut against Dubnica on 16 April 2011.

In September 2017, Ciprys joined Austrian club USV Herrnbaumgarten.

External links
 
 Radoslav Ciprys at Futbalnet 
 Eurofotbal profile 
 Radoslav Ciprys at Footballdatabase

References

1987 births
Living people
Slovak footballers
Slovak expatriate footballers
Sportspeople from Malacky
Association football midfielders
FC Spartak Trnava players
Spartak Myjava players
MFK Skalica players
FC Hlučín players
Slovak Super Liga players
2. Liga (Slovakia) players
Slovak expatriate sportspeople in Austria
Slovak expatriate sportspeople in the Czech Republic
Expatriate footballers in Austria
Expatriate footballers in the Czech Republic